Savigny-sur-Orge (literally Savigny on Orge) is a commune in the southern suburbs of Paris, France. It is located 19.1 km (11.9 mi) from the center of Paris in the département of Essonne.

During the 2005 civil unrest in France, Savigny was the first city to implement a curfew. It is home to the Jean-Baptiste Corot High School, a twelfth-century château converted into a school and the former property of Marshal Davout.

Inhabitants of Savigny-sur-Orge are known as Saviniens. Writer Patrick Erouart-Siad (born 1955 in Savigny) won the 1993 Prix Ève Delacroix of the Académie française.

Louis-Nicolas Davout, a military commander under Napoleon, died in Savigny-sur-Orge, and one of the squares bears his name.

Population

Sport
The city hosts a baseball team called The Lions of Savigny-sur-Orge which plays at a national level.

Transport
Savigny-sur-Orge is served by Savigny-sur-Orge station on Paris RER line C.

See also
Communes of the Essonne department

References

External links

Mayors of Essonne Association 

Communes of Essonne